Buraki-ye Olya (also Romanized as Būrakī-ye ‘Olyā; also known as Būrakī, Būrakī Bālā, and Būrakī-ye Bālā) is a village in Khesht Rural District, Khesht District, Kazerun County, Fars Province, Iran. At the 2006 census, its population was 2,944, in 678 families.

References 

Populated places in Kazerun County